Tuggeranong Town Centre services the southernmost Canberra district of Tuggeranong. It is located on the south-western side of Lake Tuggeranong and composed of a large two-storey mall called South.Point Tuggeranong, as well as smaller shopping complexes, the Homeworld, and Tuggeranong Shopping Square, and many other buildings and shops. It is also the location of the Tuggeranong Interchange, a youth centre, a bowling alley, Tuggeranong SkatePark, the Tuggeranong Arts Centre and Lake Tuggeranong College.

History
In the 1970s the National Capital Development Commission recommended that the service trades area of the Tuggeranong Town Centre and Mitchell be given priority over Jerrabomberra and West Belconnen.

References

Canberra urban places